Xylophanes barbuti is a moth of the  family Sphingidae. It is known from Ecuador and Peru.

The wingspan is 84–93 mm. There is a grey band which runs from the top of the thorax to the tip of the abdomen. On the abdomen, this band is outwardly traced with thin black strips and inwardly split by a series of thin black segments. The hindwing is black with clearly divided cream-coloured teeth.

Adults are probably on wing year-round.

The larvae possibly feed on Psychotria panamensis, Psychotria nervosa and Pavonia guanacastensis.

References

barbuti
Moths described in 2007